Minuscule 16 (in the Gregory-Aland numbering), ε 449 (Soden). It is a diglot Greek-Latin minuscule manuscript of the New Testament, on 361 parchment leaves, dated palaeographically to the 14th-century. It has full marginalia and was prepared for liturgical use.

Description 

The codex contains almost complete text of the four Gospels with lacunae (Mark 16:14–20). The text is written in two columns per page, 26 lines per page.

There is also a division according to the Ammonian Sections, with no references to the Eusebian Canons.

The text of the codex is written in four colours. "The general run of the narrative is in vermilion; the words of Jesus, the genealogy of Jesus, and the words of angels are in crimson; the words quoted from the Old Testament as well as those of the disciples, Zachariah, Elizabeth, Mary, Simeon, and John the Baptist are in blue; and the words of Pharisees, the centurion, Judas Iscariot, and the devil are in black." It contains only one picture.

In the Greek text Mark 16:14–20 and in the Latin text Mark 9:18–16:20 were lost. Latin texts of Mark 9:18–11:13, Luke 5:21–44; John 1:1–12:17 were added by a later hand.

Text 
The Greek text of the codex is mixed but the Byzantine text-type is predominant. Hermann von Soden classified it to the textual family Iβb, it means it has some the Caesarean readings. Aland did not place it in any Category.

In 2014, Kathleen Maxwell demonstrated minuscule 16 to be dependent upon minuscule 1528. There are red crosses at various points throughout 1528 corresponding to the locations of illustrations in 16.

Textually it is close to the manuscripts 119, 217, 330, 491, 578, 693, 1528, and 1588. They create textual Group 16 with following profile:
 Luke 1: 8, (9), 13, 23, 28, 34, 37, 43.
 Luke 10: 3, 7, 15, 19, 23, (25), 58, 63.
 Luke 20: 4, 13, 19, 50, 51, 54, 55, 62, 65.

Codex 16 forms a pair with codex 1528 which adds reading 3 and lacks 9 in Luke 1, and lacks 19 and adds 64 in Luke 10.

The Latin text in Matt. 7:13 has textual variant: "lata via et spaciosa est lila quae"; in Mt 13:3 "Ecce qai exiit Seminare Semen suum, et dum seminat quaedam cecid."

History 

The manuscript is dated by the INTF to the 14th-century.

Formerly the codex was in the hands of Strozzi family, then of Catherine de' Medici. It was examined by Wettstein, Scholz, and Paulin Martin. C. R. Gregory saw the manuscript in 1884.

It is currently housed at the Bibliothèque nationale de France (Gr. 54) at Paris.

See also 
 List of New Testament minuscules
 Textual criticism

References

External links 
 Minuscule 16 at the Encyclopedia of Textual Criticism

Greek New Testament minuscules
14th-century biblical manuscripts
Vulgate manuscripts
Bibliothèque nationale de France collections